Lynn Harriette Cohen (née Kay; August 10, 1933 – February 14, 2020) was an American actress known for her roles in film, television and theater. She was especially known for her role as Magda in the HBO series Sex and the City, which she also played in the 2008 film of the same name and its 2010 sequel, and for portraying Mags in The Hunger Games: Catching Fire.

Early life
The daughter of Louis Kay and Bertha Cornsweet Kay, Lynn Harriette Kay was born in Kansas City, Missouri, to a Jewish family. She studied for a year each at the University of Wisconsin and Northwestern University, after which she moved to St. Louis, where she began acting in regional theater.

Career
Cohen began her career in the 1970s appearing in Off-Broadway productions, receiving Drama League Award and Lucille Lortel Awards nominations. Notable credits include Hamlet starring Kevin Kline and Macbeth starring Liev Schreiber.  On Broadway, Cohen appeared in Orpheus Descending starring Vanessa Redgrave (1989) and Ivanov, reuniting her with Kevin Kline (1994).
 
Cohen consistently played powerful, impressive women. Her first notable film role was in the 1993 comedy Manhattan Murder Mystery. From 1993 to 2006, she played Judge Elizabeth Mizener in the NBC drama series Law & Order, appearing in a total of 12 episodes. She also guest-starred on NYPD Blue, Law & Order: Special Victims Unit, Law & Order: Criminal Intent, Blue Bloods, and had a recurring role on Damages.

From 2000 to 2004, Cohen had a recurring role as Magda in the HBO comedy series Sex and the City. She reprised her role in the 2008 film of the same name, as well as its 2010 sequel. Cohen also appeared in Munich (2005) as Golda Meir, Vanya on 42nd Street, Synecdoche, New York, Eagle Eye and The Hunger Games: Catching Fire.

Personal life
Cohen married Gilbert Frazen in 1957, and he died in 1960. In 1964, she married Ronald Theodore Cohen, and they remained married until her death in 2020. She had one adult child and two grandchildren.

Death
Cohen died on February 14, 2020, in New York at the age of 86.

Selected filmography

Without a Trace (1983) – Woman with Dog
Manhattan Murder Mystery (1993) – Lillian House
Law & Order (1993–2006, TV Series) – Judge Elizabeth Mizener
Vanya on 42nd Street (1994) – Vonenskaya
I Shot Andy Warhol (1996) – Hotel Earle Concierge
Walking and Talking (1996) – Andrew's mom
Everything Relative (1996) – Mrs. Kessler
Hurricane Streets (1997) – Lucy
Deconstructing Harry (1997) – Janet's mom
Once We Were Strangers (1997) – Natasha
My Divorce (1997) – Mother
Cosby (1997, TV Series, Appeared in Episode: "Florida") – Dorothy
Meschugge (1998) – Mrs. Fish
Cradle Will Rock (1999) – Mama Silvano
Just One Time (1999) – Sophia
Fast Food Fast Women (2000) – Jesse
Ten Hundred Kings (2000) – Anne Shephard
Sex and the City (2000–2004, TV Series) – Magda
The Jimmy Show (2001) – Ruth
Hi-Yah! (2002, Short) – Gramma
Fishing (2002) – Ruthie
The Station Agent (2003) – Patty
Evergreen (2004) – Grandmom
Last Call (2004, Short) – Betsy
The Last Days of Leni Riefenstahl (2005, Short) – Leni Riefenstahl
While the Widow Is Away (2005, Short) – The Widow
Munich (2005) – Golda Meir
Invincible (2006) – Mrs. Spegnetti
The Hottest State (2006) – Harris's mother
Delirious (2006) – Muffy Morrison
Days of Our Lives (2007, TV Series) – Ms. Ashwell
The Summoning of Everyman (2007) – Doctor
Ablution (2007, Short) – Esther
Then She Found Me (2007) – Trudy Epner
The Life Before Her Eyes (2007) – Sister Beatrice
Across The Universe (2007) – Grandmother Carrigan
Deception (2008) – Woman
Sex and the City (2008) – Magda
Synecdoche, New York (2008) – Caden's mother
Eagle Eye (2008) – Mrs. Wierzbowski
Eavesdrop (2008) – May
Staten Island (2009) – Dr. Leikovic
Everybody's Fine (2009) – Old Woman on First Train
Damages (2009–2012, TV Series, Appearance in four episodes) – Stefania McKee
Nurse Jackie (2009–2012, TV Series) – Mrs. Zimberger
The Extra Man (2010) – Lois Huber
Red Dead Redemption (2010, Video Game) – Mrs. Bush (voice)
A Little Help (2010) – Mrs. Cosolito
Sex and the City 2 (2010) – Magda
Hello Lonesome (2010) – Eleanor
The Kindergarten Shuffle (2010) – Lynn
Somewhere Tonight (2011) – Mrs. Pecorino
Law & Order: Special Victims Unit (2011, TV Series, Appeared in Episode: "Beef") – Donna Rosa Doletti
The Romance of Loneliness (2012) – Mina
Not Waving But Drowning (2012) – Sylvia
Art Machine (2012) – Roberta
Where Is Joel Baum? (2012) – Mrs. Stein
Bottled Up (2013) – Gladys
A Case of You (2013) – Harriet
Chasing Taste (2013) – Murial
The Hunger Games: Catching Fire (2013) – Mags
Gabriel (2014) - Nonny
They Came Together (2014) – Bubby
The Cobbler (2014) – Sarah Simkin
The Affair (2014, TV Series) – Joan Bailey
Getting On (2014, TV Series) – Janice Carmaglia
Deadbeat (2015, TV Series, Appeared in Episode: "Last Dance with Edith Jane") – Edith Jane
All in Time (2015) – Mrs. Joshnman
Master of None (2015, TV Series) – Carol
A Woman Like Me (2015) – Alex's mom
The Pickle Recipe (2016) – Rose
Chicago Med (2016, TV Series, Appearance in one episode) – Rose Wechsler
Sollers Point (2017) – Ladybug
Walden: Life in The Woods (2017) – Alice
Benji the Dove (2017) – Miss O'Dell
Omphalos (2018) – Babs
The Marvelous Mrs. Maisel (2018, TV Series) – Bubbabosia
After Class (2019) – Agatha
The World Without You (2019) – Gretchen
Lingua Franca (2019) – Olga
Feast of the Seven Fishes (2019) – Nonnie
The Vigil (2019) – Mrs. Litvak
God Friended Me (2020) – Rose

References

External links
 
 
 
 

1933 births
2020 deaths
20th-century American actresses
21st-century American actresses
Actresses from Kansas City, Missouri
American film actresses
Jewish American actresses
American television actresses
American stage actresses
21st-century American Jews